Cilix is a genus of moths belonging to the subfamily Drepaninae. The genus was erected by Leach in 1815.

Species
The species in this genus are:
Cilix algirica
Cilix argenta
Cilix asiatica
Cilix danieli
Cilix depalpata
Cilix filipjevi
Cilix glaucata - Chinese character
Cilix hispanica
Cilix patula
Cilix tatsienluica

References

Drepaninae
Drepanidae genera
Taxa named by William Elford Leach